Ágústa Eva Erlendsdóttir (born 28 July 1982) is an Icelandic actress and singer. She is best known for her portrayal of the controversial character Silvía Night in the television series Sjáumst með Silvíu Nótt and during the 2006 Eurovision Song Contest.

Life and career

Acting
Ágústa Eva studied acting at the École Philippe Gaulier theatre school in Paris
In 2005, she won an Edda Award for Best TV Personality and Best TV Show for her performance as Silvía Night. While in character, she was voted sexiest woman in Iceland by listeners of the national radio station RUV; as herself, she wound up in fourth place.

Music
Ágústa Eva was a member of the bands Kritikal Mazz and Ske, and in 2005 began a solo career.

Selected acting work

Discography

Singles
 "Þetta er nóg" (from Let It Go the Complete Set ("Frozen")) (2014)
 "Þegar Storminn Hefur Lægt" with Magni Ásgeirsson (2018)

References

External links
 

Erlendsdottir, Agusta Eva
Erlendsdottir, Agusta Eva
Agusta Eva Erlendsdottir
Agusta Eva Erlendsdottir
Eurovision Song Contest entrants for Iceland
Agusta Eva Erlendsdottir
Agusta Eva Erlendsdottir
Agusta Eva Erlendsdottir
Agusta Eva Erlendsdottir
Agusta Eva Erlendsdottir
Erlendsdottir, Agusta Eva
21st-century Icelandic women singers